Niagara Purple Eagles ice hockey may refer to either of the ice hockey teams that represent Niagara University:

Niagara Purple Eagles men's ice hockey
Niagara Purple Eagles women's ice hockey